The  is a personal luxury GT coupé produced from 1981 to 2005 by Toyota and sold in Japan. It was available at both Japanese Toyota dealerships called Toyota Store and Toyopet Store, and it debuted with the Z10 series, replacing the Toyopet Store exclusive Mark II coupé, and the Toyota Store exclusive Crown coupé.

In 1986, the Z20 series Soarer was launched, based on the then new A70 series Supra platform. In 1991, the Z30 series Soarer premiered in Japan, while its Lexus equivalent, the SC 300/400 debuted in the US market.

While externally identical to the SC, the Z30 series Soarer lineup offered different powertrain specifications and multiple unique vehicle configurations. In 2001, Toyota introduced a convertible-only successor in Japan as the Z40 series Soarer and elsewhere as the SC 430. In contrast to previous series, the Z40 series Soarer and SC were based on a single model and were largely equivalent. In 2005, following the introduction of Lexus in Japan, the Soarer name and emblem were discontinued, and the Z40 model became the SC 430 in common with worldwide markets.

In its home market, the Soarer was a competitor to the Nissan Leopard and Mazda Cosmo coupes, and served as Toyota's "halo car", introducing new technologies before they were installed on other Toyota products. All versions of the Soarer featured a unique winged lion emblem (often mistakenly called a Griffin) as the logo throughout the vehicle.



First generation (Z10; 1981)

The Soarer made its first appearance at the 1980 Osaka International Motor Show with the name "EX-8". The Z10 series Toyota Soarer was produced from February 1981 to December 1985, with 2.0L, 2.8L or 3.0L DOHC I-6 variants.

At its introduction in 1981, it won the Car of the Year Japan Award.

The first-generation Soarer debuted with a rear-wheel-drive configuration  based on the A60 Supra. It boasted numerous technological items, such as a touchscreen computer-controlled air conditioning climate control (Electro Multi Vision Display, on all models except the base models which featured standard fan/heater controls), digital speed and tachometer display using LEDs (that were differentiated between models), among other electronic features. Due to the compliance of Japanese external dimension and engine displacement regulations, the first-generation models were classified as "compacts", which gave Japanese buyers tax saving advantages.

The suspension utilized MacPherson struts for the front, with a trailing arm type IRS (independent rear suspension), labelled with Toyota's branding PEGASUS (Precision Engineered Geometrically Advanced SUSpension). The vehicle also came with self-diagnosis maintenance reminders.

There were a number of different engines available.
GZ10=1G-EU, 1G-GEU
MZ10=M-TEU
MZ11=5M-GEU
MZ12=6M-GEU

Early M-TEU powered MZ10 models were different in some regards to later MZ10s. Some of the difference are listed below.
Later MZ10 models had a water-to-air intercooler
Later MZ10 models had an oil-and-water-cooled turbo (as opposed to the oil-cooled-only turbo in the early MZ10s)

The MZ12 model was equipped with the following features:
ABS
Cruise Control
7-way adjustable (driver only) leather seats
First Toyota automobile with Toyota Electronic Modulated Suspension (TEMS) (1983)
Digital Automatic climate control
Audible warning messages
Electro Multi Vision Display (CRT display) (1985)

Second generation (Z20; 1986) 

The Z20 series Toyota Soarer was produced from January 1986 to April 1991, and was available in several variants.
The styling of the second-generation Soarer is similar of that of the X80 series Cressida, Mark II, Chaser and Cresta. The Soarer shared its platform with the newly introduced A70 series Supra.

The Z20 Soarer introduced a vehicle information display system with Electro Multi Vision and visual information cassettes.

In 1986, the Toyota Soarer introduced a world first electronically controlled (Toyota Electronic Modulated Suspension), semi-active full air suspension (spring constant, variable attenuation force).

In 1988, TOM'S released a limited model package named the C5. The 7M-GTE in the Tom's C5 Soarer saw the power upgrades similar to those seen in the Turbo-A Supra of the same year.

In April 1989, a limited 500 unit variant called the Aerocabin was introduced. This came with only 2 seats and an electric folding roof. The Aerocabin came with the same specs as the GT-Limited and were only available with the 7M-GTE engine, 4-speed automatic transmission, tan leather interior and pearlescent paint.

In 1988 the Soarer Z20 was given a facelift. The grill and rear taillights were redesigned and minor interior changes were made (climate control, dash). Other than that engines were improved:
 1G-GTEU 180 -> 
 7M-GTEU 230 -> 

Unlike the A70 Supra, the 2.5 L twin turbo 1JZ-GTE was not made available for the Z20 Soarer. However, all models built from May 1989 including the Aerocabin did have a revised crossmember.

Third generation (Z30; 1991) 

In 1987, following the design freeze of Lexus division's flagship UCF10 LS 400 (Celsior) sedan due in 1989, Toyota commissioned its California design studio Calty to develop a new luxury coupe. In mid 1991, the vehicle designed by the studio debuted in the U.S. as the Lexus SC 300/400. 

That same year, Toyota debuted the third-generation Z30 series Soarer in Japan, replacing the Z20 series. The Z30 series Soarer shared the body and key components with the Lexus SC, with different interior features, powertrain configurations, and enhanced performance.

The new Soarer continued some of the features of earlier models, such as digital dashboard instrumentation and integrated car systems control via the in-dash EMV touchscreen. It was also one of the first cars in the world to feature a factory GPS automotive navigation system via CD-ROM. This generation of the Soarer was considered an expensive and extravagant luxury car in Japan. It was longer and wider than a Crown, while comfortably accommodating two passengers, with only modest space available for rear seat passengers. It did not comply with Japanese Government dimension regulations which made buyers liable for yearly taxes due to its size. The larger engines also obliged Japanese buyers to pay more annual road tax.

From launch in 1991 until 2000 all models were available with a 4-speed automatic transmission. In addition, the sportier JZZ30 Soarer could be had with a 5-speed manual transmission. All models were available with a Torsen torque-sensing differential. Unlike their US Lexus equivalents, the Z30-series Soarer lineup never received a 5-speed automatic, and only the six-cylinder versions received variable valve timing (VVTi) engines, in 1996. 

Styling-wise, the Soarer received only minor changes during its 9-year production run, mostly external. External changes were shared with the U.S Lexus models. Changes were:
 Series 1, May 1991 - December 1993: original body and style.
From May 1992 Series 1 received an update with heated seats and exterior temperature display.
 Series 2, January 1994 - August 1996: new front bumper with one-piece lower grille, fog lights replace cornering lights, new tail lights.
 Series 3, August 1996 - December 2000: new front bumper with upper grille, oval fog lights, new tail lights, longer rear bumper, standard side skirts, elevated rear spoiler, body stripe.

Starting in 1997, the Soarer was used as a high speed patrol car in multiple Japanese prefectures, using the 2.5GT trim with a 5-speed manual transmission.

Z30 series Soarer models

JZZ30 Soarer

The JZZ30 was the only model sold continuously from the introduction of the 30 series in 1991 until production ceased in 2000. As the sportiest model in the range it was also the only one available with a R154 manual transmission. Like other models in the range there were two different equipment grades available, the base GT-T and the better-equipped GT-TL which added electric seats, wood trim, cruise control and Toyota's TEMS electronic damper adjustment to the list of standard features.

The JZZ30 was powered by the 2.5-litre 1JZ-GTE turbocharged engine. This was in keeping with the Japanese Manufacturers' advertised power limit agreement, however real-world power outputs were somewhat higher. In August 1996, the engine received Toyota's variable valve timing system (VVTi) and in conjunction with a single, more efficient turbocharger, produced much better high and mid-range torque and better fuel economy. Official power output remained limited to 280 PS, although torque was now  at 2,400 rpm.

JZZ31 Soarer
While the Lexus SC300 was available from the start of the new series' US introduction in 1991, the equivalent Japan-market Soarer model — the JZZ31 — was not introduced until 1994, where it was marketed as the "new base model" Soarer. 1994 also saw the introduction of the new black interior colour scheme which replaced the grey colour scheme used in blue, red, and black external colour cars until the end of 1993. The JZZ31 was the only one of the two JZZ models to feature manually adjustable black leather seats. The black interior scheme became the prominent interior scheme for all Japanese Soarers by the end of production.

While the increasing cost and slowing sales of the V8 models in the mid-to-late 1990s led to their discontinuation, the six-cylinder JZZ31 and JZZ30 were to remain in production until the Z30 series was replaced by the Z40 series in 2001.

UZZ30 Soarer
The UZZ30 was introduced in Japan as the 'base' model of the V8 powered 30 series lineup. Fitted with the same 4.0-litre quad-cam V8 as the UZZ31/32, it benefited in the performance stakes due to its considerably lighter weight. The UZZ30 used a standard Tokico coilover suspension setup, basic stereo system, manual steering column, and very few electronic aids. While the UZZ31 and UZZ32 models had electrically adjusted heated leather seats with memory, those in the UZZ30 were upholstered in velour and had no heating or memory. The UZZ30 also came without sunroof or rear wiper. As the car was substantially lighter due to the exclusion of all the luxury amenities, it was a considered a driver's car, with good power, handling and braking.

The UZZ30 series Soarer was used as the base vehicle for the Lexus SC400 (model code UZZ30) exported to the United States, although to satisfy U.S. requirements, a comprehensive range of luxury options was offered, including some features of the UZZ31, such as seat memory position, traction control, sunroof, sun visors with courtesy light and electronic steering position adjustment. Local Japanese Soarers had an electronic dashboard which used an integral mirror to display the instruments holographically. This design was never offered on a USA spec model. Those cars came with a standard dash layout of round dials and lit needles similar to the LS400 Lexus sedan. Whereas the left hand drive version of UZZ30 was made throughout the entire 9-year production run, the right hand drive version was made from 1991 until 1993.

UZZ31 Soarer "Limited"

The UZZ31 and UZZ32 Soarers were the luxury GT versions of the range, with more features and equipment than the UZZ30 and the 6-cylinder models, and even the U.S market Lexus SC300/400. The EMV (Electro Multi Vision) touchscreen system which was pioneered in the Z10 and Z20 Soarers was again available and provided a screen with television, GPS navigation, diagnostics, car computer, reversing camera and touch control of all functions of the climate control and audio system. The latter was highly sophisticated, with balanced-signal digital signal processing, 12-disc CD stacker and 7 speakers with subwoofer.

All three V8 models were powered by Toyota's acclaimed 1UZ-FE quad-cam all-alloy 4-litre V8. While rated at marginally less power and torque than the turbocharged JZZ30 counterpart ( at 5,400 rpm,  at 4,600 rpm) the V8, called the 4.0GT-L was renowned for its smoothness and refinement.

The UZZ31 featured a driver-adjustable air suspension system that had two settings for both ride height and damper stiffness. The high-pressure air was provided by an electric pump mounted at the front of the car. Also featured on the UZZ31 series were a host of electronic features including automatic headlights (shared also with the UZZ30), speed-sensitive wipers, electric-controlled 2-position memory seats with heated feature as an additional factory option, electronically adjustable steering column with memory, optional reversing camera, cabin air purifying system (also shared with the JZZ31 from 1994), touch screen TV with 12-stack CD player, touch screen SatNav, and a full onboard computer diagnostic system which would output to the TV display unit. Like the JZZ30, the UZZ31 came with optional sunroof and rear wiper.

Additionally, the UZZ31 could be "special ordered" from Toyota Japan without the EMV, instead being fitted with the radio/CD unit of the UZZ30 with separate climate control. Additionally, electric velour seats from the UZZ30 and JZZ30 models could be special ordered in place of the standard UZZ31 / UZZ32 leather electric seats. These special-order cars would take only a week to produce from the time of the order to completed product. It is not known how many non-EMV UZZ31s were made, although they were offered from the very start of production in 1991. These non-EMV UZZ31 Soarers are uncommon, with only the UZZ32 more rare.

UZZ32 Soarer "Limited"
The UZZ32 was the top-of-the-line 30 series, featuring all of the options available on the UZZ31 and the addition of four-wheel steering and a complex, computer-controlled hydraulic Toyota Active Control Suspension. This did away with conventional springs and anti-roll (stabiliser) bars in favour of hydraulic struts controlled by an array of sensors (such as yaw velocity sensors, vertical G sensors, height sensors, wheel speed sensors, longitudinal and lateral G sensors) that detected cornering, acceleration and braking forces. 

The system worked well and gave an unusually controlled yet smooth ride with no body roll. However, the additional  weight of hydraulic componentry and power requirements of the system affected performance, and significantly reduced fuel economy compared to the standard UZZ30 and UZZ31 models.

As a result, only 873 UZZ32s were made and are typically the most sought-after model in right-hand drive markets such as the Japan, UK, Australia and New Zealand.

Colours
Japanese Soarers were available in many colours. Some were offered continuously throughout the run and some as limited runs or one-offs. These colour runs did not always match the equivalent U.S. market offerings on the Lexus SC.

From 1991 until 1993, Soarers with external paint codes 8J5 and 202 came with a grey interior colour scheme. Those in 6M2 were available with both grey and "spruce" (blue-grey) interior schemes. Models in 3k3 could have grey or tan interiors. Models with paint codes 4k9, 051 (1991-1998) and 057 (1998-2000) came with tan interiors exclusively. Similarly, those with paint code 176 and 6M3 came with spruce interior colour exclusively.

From 1994, a black interior scheme replaced grey (becoming the predominant interior colour from 1998-2000) and from 1994-2000, cars with external paint code 202 came exclusively with the black interior. Models in 3L2 were available with either black or tan interiors.

In 1995, a limited edition was offered with Baltic Blue Metallic (752) paint that was shared with the 1993-1996 Toyota Supra and the 1994-1999 Toyota Celica. Roughly 199 SC300s were imported into the USA with this exterior paint code and tan only interior, as well as 256 SC400s. 

In 1996, exterior colour 6P2 replaced exterior colour 6M2 and 8L5 replaced 8J5. The spruce interior was discontinued in 1998. Thereafter, models in 1A0 and 1C0 which had come with spruce interiors were changed to black interiors and 6P2 cars became available with black or tan interior schemes.

Fourth generation (Z40; 2001) 

The 40 series Soarer model was largely identical to its Lexus equivalent, sold outside Japan as the Lexus SC 430 since 2001. The Z40 series Soarer 430SCV featured a hardtop which could fold into the boot of the car, in the fashion of the contemporary Mercedes-Benz SL. The coupe was equipped with the 3UZ-FE VVTi (variable valve timing) 4.3-litre V8 engine, as was available in the Lexus LS 430 luxury sedan. The shared body style of the Z40 series Soarer/SC 430 was developed by Toyota designers at design studios in France and Japan. Compared with the Z30 series, some observers generally considered the fourth generation a retreat in visual style due to its more compact and top heavy appearance. 

With the Z40 series Soarer, design and production synergies culminated in the development of a single shared design configuration for both the Soarer and Lexus models, unlike the previous generations. The rise of Lexus as Toyota's premium worldwide marque also contributed to the design focus on the Lexus model configuration rather than a separate Toyota-branded series of Soarer coupes. On July 26, 2005, Lexus was introduced in Japan with the 2006 SC 430 TSOOH in its lineup. The debut of Lexus and the SC 430 coincided with the conclusion of Toyota Soarer sales.

References

External links 

 Toyota Soarer history at ateupwithmotor.com
 The Toyota JZ Engine Guide
 1991-2000 Toyota Soarer FAQ
 1991-2000 Toyota Soarer Colour Guide

1990s cars
2000s cars
2+2 coupés
Cars introduced in 1981
Grand tourers
Hardtop convertibles
Rear-wheel-drive vehicles
Soarer
Vehicles with four-wheel steering
Cars discontinued in 2005